Sir Alexander McKenzie Livingstone (18 October 1880 – 14 September 1950) was a Scottish Liberal Party politician.

Early years
Livingstone was born in Kelvin, Glasgow in October 1880 to Duncan Livingstone and Catherine McKenzie.

Political career
At the 1918 general election, he was an unsuccessful candidate in the Dover constituency.  He was again unsuccessful at the 1922 general election, when he stood in Inverness.

Livingstone was elected to Parliament on his third attempt, at the 1923 general election, when he was returned as member of parliament for the Western Isles. He held the seat at the 1924 election, and stood down from Parliament at the 1929 general election.

He was the Whip of the 'Radical' Parliamentary Group, formed in opposition to the leadership of David Lloyd George. He declared himself unable to endorse the Liberal Unemployment Pledge, and consequently withdrew in 1929 as Liberal candidate for the Western Isles. He joined the Labour Party in 1930.

Death
Livingstone died in Islington, London in September 1950 at the age of 69 and is buried in a family grave at Highgate Cemetery.

References

 
Who's Who

External links 
 >
 http://www.ukwhoswho.com/view/article/oupww/whowaswho/U228286/LIVINGSTONE_Sir_Alexander_Mackenzie?index=18&results=AdvancedSearchResults&query=0

1880 births
1950 deaths
Burials at Highgate Cemetery
Scottish Liberal Party MPs
Members of the Parliament of the United Kingdom for Scottish constituencies
UK MPs 1923–1924
UK MPs 1924–1929
Knights Bachelor